Christopher Flexen Jr. (born July 1, 1994) is an American professional baseball pitcher for the Seattle Mariners of Major League Baseball (MLB). He previously played in MLB for the New York Mets and in the KBO League for the Doosan Bears.

Amateur career
Flexen attended Newark Memorial High School in Newark, California where he was the quarterback of the school's football team and made the varsity baseball team as a freshman. His outstanding ability in two sports led to him earning his nickname "Flex”. Flexen initially committed to play college baseball for the Arizona State Sun Devils but was drafted in the 14th round of the 2012 Major League Baseball draft by the New York Mets and was lured away from his commitment by a $375,000 signing bonus.

Professional career

New York Mets
Flexen spent 2012 with the Kingsport Mets, where he posted a 1–3 win–loss record with a 5.63 earned run average (ERA) in seven games. Flexen returned to Kingsport for the 2013 season, where he was 8–1 with a 2.09 ERA in 11 starts. In 2014, Flexen played for the Savannah Sand Gnats, where he was 3–5 with a 4.83 ERA in 13 starts. Flexen underwent Tommy John surgery in 2014. Flexen spent 2015 with Savannah, the Brooklyn Cyclones, and the GCL Mets, where he posted a combined 2.42 ERA in 12 games between the three clubs. In 2016, he pitched for the St. Lucie Mets where he was 10–9 with a 3.56 ERA in 25 starts. The Mets added him to their 40-man roster after the 2016 season. Flexen started 2017 with St. Lucie, and after posting a 2.13 ERA there while striking out over a batter per inning in 3 starts, he was called up to the Binghamton Rumble Ponies on May 31.

Flexen made his MLB debut on July 27, 2017, against the San Diego Padres at Petco Park. He gave up 4 runs on 5 hits in the start. He also became the fifth Mets player in franchise history to give up a home run to the first batter he faced in the Major Leagues after allowing one to Manuel Margot on only his third pitch. On August 8, 2017, Flexen recorded his first Major League win against the Texas Rangers at Citi Field, pitching 5.1 innings, allowing 3 earned runs and striking out 4 batters.

MLB.com ranked Flexen as New York's ninth-best prospect going into the 2018 season. On May 19, Flexen, who started the season in the Pacific Coast League, was promoted to the Mets. He made only four appearances for the big league club, including one start, struggling to a 12.79 ERA and 3.16 WHIP over those outings. He underwent knee surgery in early August, ending his 2018 season.

Doosan Bears
Flexen was designated for assignment on December 6, 2019, and on the next day, it was announced that Flexen signed a one-year contract with KBO's Doosan Bears, the reigning Korean Series champion. Flexen pitched to a 3.01 ERA with 10.2 K/9 for the Bears in 2020.

Seattle Mariners
On December 9, 2020, Flexen signed a two-year, $4.75MM contract with the Seattle Mariners.

Flexen made the starting rotation to start the 2021 season and made his first start of the year on April 3 against the San Francisco Giants. He pitched five scoreless innings, allowed four hits and two walks, struck out six batters, and was credited with the win. His 2021 season with Seattle represented a marked improvement from his past performances in MLB. Among qualified American League pitchers that year, he finished in the top 10 in ERA (3.61), wins (14), ERA+ (111), Fielding Independent Pitching (3.89), and games started (31). He also recorded the most starts of 7 innings pitched with 1 earned run or fewer allowed among all AL pitchers. Over the course of the 2021 season, he attempted pickoffs at first base 141 times, more than any other major league pitcher, and picked off three runners.

References

External links

1994 births
Living people
People from Newark, California
Baseball players from California
Major League Baseball pitchers
American expatriate baseball players in South Korea
New York Mets players
Seattle Mariners players
Kingsport Mets players
Savannah Sand Gnats players
Gulf Coast Mets players
Brooklyn Cyclones players
St. Lucie Mets players
Binghamton Rumble Ponies players
Las Vegas 51s players
Syracuse Mets players
Doosan Bears players